Agnieszka Kąkolewska (born 17 October 1994) is a Polish volleyball player, playing as a middle blocker. She is part of the Poland women's national volleyball team.

She competed at the 2013 Women's European Volleyball Championship, and 2019 Montreux Volley Masters.
On club level she played for SMS PZPS Sosnowiec.

Awards

Individual
 2019 Montreux Volley Masters "Best Middle Blocker"
 2019 European Championship "Best Middle Blocker"

References

External links
http://www.pzps.pl/en/I-League/Women/32/2/leaguePlayers,id,777,group,1.html
http://www.baku2015.com/news/article/new-poland-coach-brings-back-miros-and-pycia-volleyball-team.html
http://worldgrandprix.2016.fivb.com/en/group2/schedule/6980-poland-argentina/match

1994 births
Living people
Polish women's volleyball players
Place of birth missing (living people)
Sportspeople from Poznań
Volleyball players at the 2015 European Games
European Games silver medalists for Poland
European Games medalists in volleyball